I Can't Say Goodbye may refer to:

 "I Can't Say Goodbye" (Mike Curb Congregation song)
 "I Can't Say Goodbye" (Kim Wilde song)